Amirmohammad Yousefi Golkhah (born 24 february 2000) is an Iranian professional footballer who plays as a goalkeeper for the Persian Gulf Pro League club Persepolis.

Club career 
After playing in Esteghlal under-19 club, he joined Persepolis under-19 team and then Persepolis under-21 team, and finally joined Persepolis as his first team in Iran's senior league.

Persepolis 
In the first season of his presence in Persepolis with the presence of Alireza Beiranvand, the prominent goalkeeper of the Iranian national team, and in the following seasons with the presence of Hamed Lak, Ahmad Gohari and Božidar Radošević, he did not have the opportunity to play officially for Persepolis.

Fajr Sepasi 
On 24 July 2022, Rafiei signed a two-year contract with Fajr Sepasi.

Career statistics

Honours
Persepolis
Persian Gulf Pro League (1):2020–21 Runner-Up (1):2021–22
Iranian Super Cup (1): 2020 ; Runner-up (1): 2021
AFC Champions League Runner-up (1): 2020

References

External links 
varzesh3

2000 births
Living people
Iranian footballers
Association football goalkeepers